Jemmy's Cove (sometimes Jim's Cove or Jimmy's Cove) is a tiny abandoned town located near New Harbour, Fortune Bay in Newfoundland and Labrador, Canada that had a peak population of 6 in 1911.

History 
Located near the abandoned community of New Harbour, Fortune Bay in Fortune Bay, Jemmy's Cove residents were primarily fishermen of the Church of England faith. The family of John Fudge are believed to have been the first settlers who first appear there in 1890. By the turn of the 20th century, a family of Keepings joined them.

Demographics

See also 
New Harbour, Fortune Bay
Trammer, Newfoundland and Labrador
Femme, Newfoundland and Labrador

References 

Ghost towns in Newfoundland and Labrador